Holzschuh may refer to:

 the German word for wooden shoe
 Lizzi Holzschuh (1908–1979), Austrian singer and actress